Thomas Paulay   (26 May 1923 – 28 June 2009) was a Hungarian-New Zealand earthquake engineer.

Academic career
Trained as chemical engineer, after fleeing Hungary to West Germany, Paulay arrived in New Zealand in 1951, and became a naturalised New Zealand citizen in 1957. After a PhD 'The coupling of shear walls', in 1961, he joined the Department of Civil Engineering at the University of Canterbury, where he spent many years studying the seismic behaviour and design of structures.

In the 1986 Queen's Birthday Honours, Paulay was appointed an Officer of the Order of the British Empire, for services to civil engineering.

Paulay delivered the fourth Mallet–Milne memorial lecture for the Society for Earthquake and Civil Engineering Dynamics, in London in 1993.

Selected works
 Seismic design of reinforced concrete and masonry buildings, 
 Simplicity and confidence in seismic design, 
 Reinforced concrete structures,

References

External links
 google scholar 
 institutional homepage 

1923 births
2009 deaths
People from Sopron
Hungarian emigrants to New Zealand
Academic staff of the University of Canterbury
University of Canterbury alumni
New Zealand civil engineers
New Zealand Officers of the Order of the British Empire
Naturalised citizens of New Zealand
Hungarian military personnel of World War II